The 1998 Georgia Southern Eagles football team represented the Georgia Southern University as a member of the Southern Conference (SoCon) during the 1998 NCAA Division I-AA football season.  Led by second-year head coach Paul Johnson, the Eagles compiled and overall record of 14–1 with a mark of 8–0 in conference play, winning the SoCon title. Georgia Southern advanced to the NCAA Division I-AA Football Championship playoffs, where they defeated Colgate in the first round, Connecticut in the quarterfinals, and Western Illinois in the semifinals before falling to UMass in the NCAA Division I-AA Championship Game. The Eagles played their home games at Paulson Stadium in Statesboro, Georgia.

Schedule

References

Georgia Southern
Georgia Southern Eagles football seasons
Southern Conference football champion seasons
Georgia Southern Eagles football